Phil Coppess (born September 2, 1954 ) is an American former long-distance runner.  Coppess went to high school in Oxford Junction, Iowa where he was a standout runner.  Coppess won the State Boy's Outdoor Track & Field 2 mile run in 1971; he won the State Cross Country in 1971; the State Cross Country Individual Mile in 1971; the State Boy's Indoor Track & Field 2 mile run in 1972; and the State Boy's Outdoor Track & Field 2 mile run in 1972.

In the mid-1980s, he was one of the best US marathon runners, although he worked full-time in a factory and was a single parent. In 1981 he won the Chicago Marathon and the Rocket City Marathon in Huntsville. In 1982 he finished sixth in the London Marathon. In 1985 he won the Twin Cities Marathon with his personal best of 2:10:05, one of the fastest times ever run by an American. The time set a course record that stood for 33 years until broken by Kenyan Dominic Ondoro.

In 1985, Coppess was named the Road Runner of the Year by the Road Runners Club of America.

References

External links

1954 births
Living people
American male long-distance runners
American male marathon runners
Chicago Marathon male winners
Track and field athletes from Iowa